The Sheriff of Berwick was historically a royal official, who was responsible for enforcing justice in Berwickshire, Scotland. Prior to 1748 most sheriffdoms were held on a hereditary basis. From that date, following the Jacobite uprising of 1745, the hereditary sheriffs were replaced by salaried sheriff-deputes, qualified advocates who were members of the Scottish Bar.

The sheriffdom was merged into the new sheriffdom of Haddington and Berwick in 1856.

Sheriffs of Berwick

Norman (1147)
Walter de Lindsay (1206)
Robert of Upsettlington (1220)
Ingram de Balliol (1228)
William de Lindsay (c. 1230)
David de Graham (1236)
John Maxwell
David de Graham (1264)
Hugh de Berkeley (1266)
John de Soulis (1288)
William Lindsay
Richard Fraser
Osbert of Spaldington (1295-1297)
John de Burdon (1300-1302)
Edmund Hastings, 1st Baron Hastings (1312)
John FitzWalter, 2nd Baron FitzWalter (1325)
Hugh Gifford (1329)
Robert Lauder (1330)
John I Preston, Baron of Craigmillar (c. 1420)
Patrick Nesbit (1437)
Walter de Halyburton
John de Halyburton (1447)
Alexander Hume (1447) - Deputy
Patrick Hepburn of Dunsyre (1450)
Adam Hepburn, Master of Hailes (1470)
Patrick Hepburn, 1st Earl of Bothwell (1480)
Adam Hepburn, 2nd Earl of Bothwell (1511)
Patrick Hume, Earl of Marchmont (1690–1710) 
Alexander, Earl of Home (1710-1715) 
Patrick Hume, Earl of Marchmont (1715-1724) 
Alexander, Earl of Marchmont (1724-) 

Sheriffs-Depute
George Ker, 1755–  (first Sheriff-depute of modern era)
David Hume of Ninewells, 1783–1793  (Sheriff of Linlithgow, 1793–1811)
John Swinton, 1793–1809 
David Douglas of Reston, 1809–1813 
William Boswell, <1819–1840
Robert Bell 1841–1856  (Sheriff of Haddington and Berwick, 1856)

 For sheriffs after 1856 see Sheriff of Haddington and Berwick

See also
 Historical development of Scottish sheriffdoms

References

sheriff